Jared Goldberg (born June 17, 1991) is an American World Cup alpine ski racer, a member of the U.S. Ski Team, and resident of Holladay, Utah.

Goldberg was the 2010 U.S. Junior Championships combined champion, and won the downhill title in the 2013 U.S. Championships. Goldberg competed for the United States in the 2014 Winter Olympics in Sochi, Russia, and the 2018 Winter Olympics in PyeongChang, South Korea.

Early life
Goldberg was born in Boston, Massachusetts, to Don (the owner of a computer consultants temporary staffing company) and Annette Goldberg (a nurse). His parents, both part-time ski instructors, met for the first time at Killington Ski Resort in Vermont.   His family moved to Utah when he was four years old, and his hometown is Sugar House, Salt Lake City, Utah. He is Jewish and had his Bar Mitzvah celebration in a ski lodge.

Goldberg attended Skyline High School in Salt Lake City, where he played the midfield position in lacrosse and was also on the golf team. He attends Westminster College, where he studies mechanical engineering. His teammates call him “Goldie.”

Skiing career
Goldberg's club is Snowbird Sports Education Foundation. He first started competing in both skiing and snowboarding.

Goldberg was the 2010 U.S. Junior Championships combined champion, and took second in Junior downhill and third in junior giant slalom (GS) in the 2011 U.S. Junior Championships. He took third in Super-G (SG) at the 2012 U.S. Championships.

Goldberg won the downhill title in the 2013 U.S. Championships in Copper Mountain, Colorado, where he also took second in SG. He took third in GS at the 2014 U.S. Championships.

In 2013, Goldberg was the overall Nor-Am Champion, competing in three different circuits that season; Nor-Am Cup, Europa Cup, and World Cup.

Goldberg represented the United States at the 2014 Winter Olympics and competed in  Sochi, Russia, finishing 11th in the  combined and 19th in the giant slalom. At 22 years of age, he was the youngest member of the 2014 US Men's Alpine Team.

In the 2015 World Championships, Goldberg had the third-fastest downhill run, AC, in Vail/Beaver Creek. In 2016, skiing at Snowbird in Utah, his left ski hit a hidden tree trunk and he snapped his Achilles tendon.

In 2017, he competed in the World Championships in St. Moritz, Switzerland, in February, and took second place in SG at the U.S. Alpine Championships in March. In December, he gained his first World Cup top ten finish with ninth place in the downhill at Val Gardena, Italy.

At the 2018 Winter Olympics in PyeongChang, South Korea, Goldberg was 20th in the downhill, 24th in the super-G, and 36th at the combined.

World Cup results

Season standings

Top ten finishes
0 podiums; 5 top tens (5 DH)

World Championship results

Olympic results

See also
List of select Jewish skiers

References

External links

Jared Goldberg at the U.S. Ski Team
Twitter

1991 births
Living people
Alpine skiers at the 2014 Winter Olympics
Alpine skiers at the 2018 Winter Olympics
American male alpine skiers
Jewish American sportspeople
Olympic alpine skiers of the United States
Sportspeople from Boston
People from Holladay, Utah
Skiers from Salt Lake City
Westminster College (Utah) alumni
21st-century American Jews